The list of shipwrecks in June 1825 includes some ships sunk, wrecked or otherwise lost during June 1825.

1 June

3 June

4 June

5 June

10 June

11 June

12 June

17 June

18 June

21 June

22 June

25 June

27 June

28 June

29 June

30 June

Unknown date

References

1825-06